This is a comparison of chipsets designed by Nvidia.

nForce

nForce

nForce Southbridges

nForce2

nForce2

nForce2 Southbridges

nForce3 
The memory controller is integrated into the CPU, the supported memory types depend on the CPU and socket used.

nForce4

For AMD processors 
The memory controller is integrated into the CPU, the supported memory types depend on the CPU and socket used.

For Intel processors (LGA 775)

nForce 400 (GeForce 6000) 
The memory controller is integrated into the CPU, the supported memory types depend on the CPU and socket used. List is incomplete because multiple variants of 410 and 430 exist.

nForce 500 Series

For AMD processors 
The memory controller is integrated into the CPU, the supported memory types depend on the CPU and socket used.

For Intel processors

nForce 600 (GeForce 7000) Series

For AMD processors 
The memory controller is integrated into the CPU, the supported memory types depend on the CPU and socket used.

HT1.0 = (2000 MT/s) 
HT3.0 = (5200 MT/s)

For Intel processors

nForce 700 Series

For AMD processors 
The memory controller is integrated into the CPU; the supported memory is DDR2 in dual channel.

For Intel processors

GeForce 8000/9000 Series

For AMD processors 
In GeForce 8000/9000-series chipsets the memory controller is integrated into the CPU and the supported memory is DDR2 in dual channel.

For Intel processors

nForce 900 
The memory controller is integrated into the CPU, the supported memory types depend on the CPU and socket used.

nForce Professional 
The memory controller is integrated into the CPU, the supported memory types depend on the CPU and socket used.

Mobile Chipsets

For AMD processors 
The memory controller is integrated into the CPU, the supported memory types depend on the CPU and socket used.

For Intel processors

See also
 Comparison of Nvidia graphics processing units
 Comparison of AMD chipsets
 Comparison of ATI chipsets
 List of Intel chipsets
 List of VIA chipsets
 Larrabee

External links 
 Product Comparison Chart - Nvidia nForce for AMD - Desktop
 Product Comparison Chart - Nvidia nForce for Intel - Desktop (dated Aug 2007 - nForce6, Core2, LGA 775)
 NVIDIA based motherboards for Intel - Desktop (dated Mar 2008 - nForce7, Core2, LGA 775)
 NVIDIA based motherboards for AMD - Desktop